Guns & Weapons for Law Enforcement was a firearms magazine that was published eight times per year by Harris Publications.

References

External links
 Official homepage

Eight times annually magazines published in the United States
Firearms magazines
Harris Publications titles
Magazines established in 2004